Obogu is a Town in Asante Akim South District the southern part of the Ashanti Region of Ghana. The Town has different ethnic groups but largely occupied by the Ashanti people. The main occupation is farming. There is a river called Yaa Yaa-Mu. The village has a population of about 10,000 people, some of whom are permanent inhabitants while others come to trade and go back to their towns. The kinship of Obogu is aligned to the Asante Kingdom. The mayor is Godfred Abrokwa.

Villages in Ghana